The Tibet Area was a province-level administrative division of the Republic of China which consisted of Ü-Tsang (central Tibet) and Ngari (western Tibet) areas, but excluding the Amdo and Kham areas.  However, the Republic of China never exercised control over the territory, which was ruled by the Ganden Phodrang government in Lhasa.  The People's Republic of China, which overthrew the ROC in 1949, invaded Chamdo (not part of Tibet Area until 1951) in 1950 and incorporated the Dalai Lama-controlled regions in 1951.   After the 1959 Tibetan rebellion, the State Council of the PRC ordered the replacement of the Tibetan Kashag government with the "Preparatory Committee for the Tibet Autonomous Region" (PCTAR). The current Tibet Autonomous Region was established as a province-level division of the People's Republic of China in 1965.

Background

In the 18th century, the Qing dynasty established a protectorate over Tibet. After the 1904 Younghusband expedition, China attempted to exert more direct control over Tibet, including incursions and occupation of the Kham region. However, after the 1911 Xinhai Revolution which overthrew the Qing dynasty, Tibet disarmed and expelled all the Chinese officials from the Tibet Area. The newly established Republic of China unilaterally declared Tibet as being part of the "Five Races under One Union". However its policy was not consistent. While its constitution and communications with external powers maintained that Tibet was a "province" of the Republic of China, it recognized that Tibet was not part of China, inviting them to "join" China. The Dalai Lama and the Tibetan administration consistently refused the invitation. They maintained that under the priest–patron relationship that prevailed under the Qing dynasty, Tibet enjoyed wide independence and they wished to preserve it. 

Although there was no Chinese control over Tibet throughout the life of Republican China, the ROC asserted that "Tibet was placed under the sovereignty of China" when the Qing dynasty (1636–1912) ended the brief Nepalese invasion (1788–1792) of parts of Tibet in c. 1793. In 1912 the ROC established a cabinet-level Mongolian and Tibetan Affairs Commission (MTAC) led by the Executive Yuan in charge of the administration of Tibet and Outer Mongolia regions.  

The People's Republic of China (PRC), after its establishment, fought and defeated the Tibetans at the 1950 Battle of Chamdo, and took control of Tibet. The ROC government, led by Chiang Kai-shek, continued to claim Tibet as an integral part of its territory, contrary to the claims of the Dalai Lama's Central Tibetan Administration which claimed Tibetan independence.

After the 1959 Tibetan Rebellion, Chiang Kai-shek announced in his Letter to Tibetan Compatriots that the ROC's policy would be to help the Tibetan diaspora overthrow the People's Republic of China's rule in Tibet. The MTAC sent secret agents to India to disseminate pro-Kuomintang (KMT) and anti-Communist propaganda among Tibetan exiles.  In the following years, the MTAC recruited Tibetans to Taiwan to study and work, roughly 400 in number. 

After democratization in mid 1990s, the position of the Republic of China with regard to Tibet shifted.  In the opening speech to the International Symposium on Human Rights in Tibet on 8September 2007, ROC President Chen Shui-bian of the Democratic Progressive Party stated that his offices no longer treated exiled Tibetans as Chinese mainlanders. The MTAC was dissolved in 2017 by the Tsai Ing-wen administration, with its remaining functions to be taken on by the Department of Hong Kong, Macao, Inner Mongolia, and Tibet Affairs of the Mainland Affairs Council as well as the Ministry of Foreign Affairs.

Administrative divisions

1956–1959
 Administrative divisions setup by the Preparatory Committee for the Tibet Autonomous Region

See also 

 Tibet (1912–1951)
 Sino-Tibetan War (1930–1932)
 Qinghai–Tibet War (1932)
 Central Tibetan Administration (established 1959)

References

Bibliography 
 

Provinces of the Republic of China (1912–1949)
Territorial disputes of the Republic of China
History of Tibet
Former administrative divisions of China
1920s in Tibet
1930s in Tibet
1940s in Tibet
1950s in Tibet
1960s in Tibet